Mexico and the European Economic Community (EEC) signed an agreement intending to foster economic and trade relations on 15 July 1975. Mexico and the European Union (EU) have had a free trade agreement since 2000 and the two benefit from high investment flows.

Agreements
In 1997, Mexico was the first country in Latin America to sign a partnership agreement with the EU. The "EU-Mexico Economic Partnership, Political Coordination and Cooperation Agreement" entered into force in 2000 and established a free trade area (FTA) between the two parties (see trade section below). It also establishes regular high-level contact between the EU and Mexico and acted as a catalyst for increased investment flows.

Mexico and the EU reached a new agreement in principle on trade in April 2018, which will replace the first agreement once is ratified by all EU members and the Mexican Senate. The new agreement will cover all goods, including the agricultural sector. It will be the first EU trade agreement to include an anti-corruption chapter for both, the private and the public sectors.

On 28 April 2020, the EU and Mexico concluded the last outstanding element of the negotiation of their new trade agreement and agreed on the exact scope of the reciprocal opening of public procurement markets and a high level of predictability and transparency in public procurement processes. With this, the EU and Mexico can advance to the signature and ratification of this agreement in line with their respective rules and procedures.

Trade

The EU is Mexico's second largest export market after the United States, and Mexico is the EU's 12th export partner. Mexico's main exports to the EU are mineral products, machinery, electrical and transport equipment and optical photo precision instruments. EU exports to Mexico consist of machinery, electrical equipment, transport equipment, chemicals and minerals. In terms of services, Mexico exports travel/transport and construction services. The EU exports travel/transport and computer services.

The two have a broad and comprehensive FTA which entered into force in October 2000. It covers goods, services, public procurement, competition, intellectual property and investment. Bilateral investment flows are significant. A joint committee and special committees meet once a year and a joint council meets biannually.

References

 
European Union
Third-country relations of the European Union